Albay is a province of the Philippines.

Albay may also refer to:

Albay Gulf, a gulf in the southern part of Luzon island, Philippines
, a small gunboat built in 1886 for the Spanish colonial government of the Philippines
Albay, Turkish military rank corresponding to colonel (NATO OF-5)

People with the surname
R. Kan Albay (born 1975), Belgian film director